Rita Moreno: Just a Girl Who Decided to Go for It is a 2021 American documentary film, directed, produced, and edited by Mariem Pérez Riera. The film follows Rita Moreno, focusing on her early life and career.  Norman Lear, Lin-Manuel Miranda, and Michael Kantor serve as executive producers.

The film had its world premiere at the 2021 Sundance Film Festival on January 29, 2021. It was released on June 18, 2021, by Roadside Attractions.

Synopsis
For over 70 years, Rita Moreno has inspired audiences with her performances, the film follows her journey from her childhood to stardom.

Cast
 Rita Moreno
 Eva Longoria
 George Chakiris
 Gloria Estefan
 Emilio Estefan
 Héctor Elizondo
 Karen Olivo
 Justina Machado
 Sonia Manzano
 Lin-Manuel Miranda
 Mitzi Gaynor
 Chita Rivera
 Morgan Freeman
 Norman Lear
 Terrence McNally
 Whoopi Goldberg

Production
In July 2019, it was announced PBS would produce and distribute a documentary film revolving around Rita Moreno with Norman Lear and Lin-Manuel Miranda set to executive produce.

Release
The film had its world premiere at the 2021 Sundance Film Festival on January 29. In March 2021, Roadside Attractions acquired distribution rights to the film, and set it for a June 18, 2021, release. It grossed $264,626 by the time it completed its theatrical run on July 29, 2021. It became available on DVD and streaming on July 16, 2021. It was later broadcast on American Masters on PBS on October 5, 2021. As of December 7, 2021, it still remains available for free on Netflix and can be purchased or rented on streaming services.

Reception
On Rotten Tomatoes, the film has an approval rating of 95% based on reviews from 109 critics, with an average rating of 8/10. The website's critics consensus reads: "An affecting profile of screen legend Rita Moreno, Just a Girl is at once a sharp critique of the industry's crushing inequities and a beautiful homage to an artist who never backed down despite the odds."

The film won the "Best Documentary by or About Women" award from the Women Film Critics Circle.

References

External links
 
 

2021 documentary films
2021 films
American documentary films
American Masters films
Documentary films about actors
Documentary films about women in film
Puerto Rican culture in the United States
2020s English-language films
2020s American films